The 2015–16 season was the 106th season of competitive football in Germany.

Promotion and relegation

Pre–season

Post–season

National teams

Germany national football team

UEFA Euro 2016 qualifying

UEFA Euro 2016 qualifying Group D table

UEFA Euro 2016 qualifying fixtures and results

UEFA Euro 2016

UEFA Euro 2016 Group C table

UEFA Euro 2016 fixtures and results

Friendly matches

Germany women's national football team

UEFA Women's Euro 2017 qualifying

2016 SheBelieves Cup

League season

Men

Bundesliga

Bundesliga standings

2. Bundesliga

2. Bundesliga standings

3. Liga

3. Liga standings

German clubs in Europe

UEFA Champions League

Play-off round

|}

Group stage

Group B

Group D

Group E

Group F

Knockout phase

Round of 16

|}

Quarter-finals

|}

Semi-finals

|}

UEFA Europa League

Qualifying phase

Third qualifying round

|}

Play-off round

|}

Group stage

Group C

Group K

Group L

Knockout phase

Round of 32

|}

Round of 16

|}

Quarter-finals

|}

UEFA Women's Champions League

Round of 32

|}

Round of 16

|}

Quarter-finals

|}

Semi-finals

|}

Final

Sources

 
Seasons in German football